The Mon Valley Thunder was an ice hockey team which played in the inaugural season of the Mid-Atlantic Hockey League in 2007.  The team played its home games in the Rostraver Ice Garden in Rostraver Township, Pennsylvania. Brian Cersosimo was the team's first and only head coach. Following the 2007-08 season the Mon Valley Thunder folded before the MAHL folded in September 2008.

External links
 Mon Valley Thunder

Mid-Atlantic Hockey League teams
Sports in Pittsburgh
Westmoreland County, Pennsylvania
Ice hockey clubs established in 2007
Defunct ice hockey teams in Pennsylvania
Thunder
Ice hockey clubs disestablished in 2008
2007 establishments in Pennsylvania
2008 disestablishments in Pennsylvania